An Irish Music Television (or IMTV) Video Music Award is an accolade bestowed upon the Irish video makers, directors and artists involved in producing the best music videos from Northern Ireland and the Republic of Ireland during the previous year. The awards have been given annually at a ceremony in Dublin since 2009, organised by the website IrishMusic.TV (IMTV) with sponsorship from the Irish Music Rights Organisation (IMRO).

Recipients

References

External links
IMTV official website

2000s in Irish music
2010s in Irish music
Awards established in 2009
Irish music awards